Scarlett BoBo is the stage name of Matthew Cameron (born December 1, 1989), a Canadian television personality and drag queen most noted as a finalist in the first season of the reality competition series Canada's Drag Race in 2020.

Career
Originally from Ottawa, Ontario, Scarlett BoBo began performing as a drag queen in the spring of 2008. Her drag mother is Tenora BoBo, with their surname coming from house mother Ginette BoBo. She moved to Toronto in 2009. She studied public relations at Humber College, and has also taken classes at circus school, incorporating skills like fire eating and aerial silks into her drag performances. Treating her drag as a form of activism, she has performed at a benefit for the Orlando nightclub shooting, as a host of the city's annual AIDS Walk for HIV/AIDS, and as the creator of the all-gender-inclusive Absolut Empire’s Ball. She has also been an active supporter of Rainbow Railroad, regularly directing a share of the proceeds from her endeavours to the organization.

In May 2020, Scarlett Bobo was announced as a contestant in the first season of the reality competition series Canada's Drag Race. She was consistently safe or high throughout the season, and won the key ball challenge, ultimately placing as a runner-up in the finale alongside Rita Baga and behind winner Priyanka. She was only the second queen in the entire history of the Drag Race franchise, following Bianca Del Rio, to make it to the finale without ever having placed low in any challenge during the season. Following the conclusion of the season, she headlined a cross-Canada tour with the other Canada's Drag Race contestants, which was performed at drive-in venues due to the ongoing social distancing restrictions remaining in place during the COVID-19 pandemic in Canada. In October, she participated alongside Priyanka, Rita Baga and Jimbo in an online panel discussion as part of the Just for Laughs festival.

For Fierté Montréal's special online edition of its annual Drag Superstars show, which featured all of the Canada's Drag Race queens in prerecorded video performances, Scarlett Bobo performed to Pink's single "Just Like Fire".

Underneath the Empire, a documentary film about Scarlett BoBo and the Absolut Empire's Ball, was screened at the TIFF Bell Lightbox in 2019 before having its television premiere on OutTV in April 2021.

Music

In 2014, she released the single "Still Fucking Going", a collaboration with her Toronto drag colleague Allysin Chaynes. She followed up with the album #BoBosexuality: The ReRelease in 2015 which included Werrrk.com’s Drag Song of The Year for 2015, Break My Heart, and later with the singles "Drop the Money" and "Qu'est-ce Que Fuck".

In October 2020, she released the new single "C.E.O."

In 2022, she joined the music label So Fierce Music.

Personal life
Matthew Cameron became engaged to Pete Maragos, a former political assistant to Ontario MPP Han Dong, in 2018.

Filmography

Discography

Studio albums

Singles

References

External links

1989 births
Living people
21st-century Canadian LGBT people
Canada's Drag Race contestants
Canadian drag queens
Canadian gay men
Canadian LGBT singers
Gay entertainers
Humber College alumni
Musicians from Ottawa
Musicians from Toronto